Stanley Switlik (December 4, 1890 – March 4, 1981) was a parachute pioneer. Born in Galicia, now part of Poland, he immigrated to the United States at the age of 16. Originally, his company made heavy sewn items such as golf bags and mailbags.

Parachute tower
With his partner George P. Putnam, he built the first parachute training tower in the United States. The first jump from this tower was on June 2, 1935 by Amelia Earhart, who described the experience as "Loads of fun!".

Death
He died of a heart attack in Marathon, Florida on March 4, 1981.

Great Adventure Controversy
In 1973 Switlik initially agreed to sell  of property he owned to the original company that eventually became Six Flags Great Adventure in Jackson, New Jersey. The controversy was how the property was to be utilized. It was his position that it would be used for a drive through animal park, but the plan of the buyers was also to include an amusement park. As a conservationist, Switlik believed the amusement park should not be built. In a long protracted legal battle which eventually went to the US Supreme Court, Mr. Switlik lost his case. A judgement of $4.8 million had been originally awarded, but the long battle increased the payment substantially due to interest on the original judgement. This resulted in the bankruptcy to him and his family. Great Adventure was built and now includes both amusement rides and a drive through animal park.

Legacy
The Stanley Switlik Elementary school in Marathon, Florida is named for him,  as is the Switlik Elementary School in Jackson, New Jersey. Switlik Residents Hall at Rider University in Lawrenceville, New Jersey is also named after Stanley Switlik. He served on the Board of Trustees of Rider for 16 years and received an honorary degree in 1954.

References

External links
Parachute tower, U.S. patent
Switlik Company Website

1890 births
1981 deaths
People from Jackson Township, New Jersey
Parachuting in the United States
People from the Kingdom of Galicia and Lodomeria
People from Marathon, Florida
Austro-Hungarian emigrants to the United States